Paul-Henri Campbell (born 1982) is a German-American author. He is a bilingual author of poetry and prose in English and German. He studied classical philology, with a concentration on ancient Greek, as well as Catholic theology at the National University of Ireland in Maynooth and at the Goethe University in Frankfurt am Main.

His work has led him on the search for modern-day mythologies.  He describes his approach as mythical realism. Campbell's contributions have been featured and published in German and American literary magazines including Lichtungen, World Literature Today, Hessischer Literaturebote, Akzente, entwürfe, and Cordite Poetry Review.

Personal life
Campbell was born 1982 in Boston, Massachusetts, to a former U. S. Army officer and a German nurse. He grew up in Massachusetts and moved with his family to Germany, where he completed his final secondary school examinations (Abitur) in Bavaria.  Campbell was born with a serious heart condition and has carried a pacemaker since the age of 24. He also had a life-threatening brain tumor removed at the Boston Children's Hospital at age 10, and has been epileptic ever since. Currently, he is preparing a dissertation in Foundational Theology at the Jesuit Seminary, Sankt Georgen, in Frankfurt/Main, Germany.

Works and views
For his poetry collection "nach den narkosen" (German: "after anesthesia" 2017), he received the Bavarian Arts and Literary Prize. The same book was listed by Gregor Dotzauer at Literaturhaus Berlin as one of the ten best poetry collections in 2017 and recommended by the German Academy for Language and Literature for 2018 by Uljana Wolf. Campbell is primarily a poet.

Moving away from themes, such as space exploration, the Pontiac Firebird Trans-Am, New York's A-train, the aircraft carrier  or Concorde, his poetry now deals with living with disability in terms of living an artificial life.  Campbell draws on his personal experience with a major heart defect (univentricle) and his reliance on a pacemaker.  In reference to Judith Butler´s notion of heteronormativity, Campbell coined the term "salutonormativity" which assumes that general discourse is imagined from the perspective of healthy life - institutions, laws, visions of a good life, and language are dominated by health. In his book "after anesthesia", Campbell focuses on fragile, insufficient, sick and infected language. His poetry questions the paradigm of healthy language.

After working with the Leipzig-based painter Aris Kalaizis for several years, Campbell published several essays on contemporary painting, especially on painters from the former GDR, such as Hartwig Ebersbach, Arno Rink, Michael Morgner, Sighard Gille or Aris Kalaizis.

In January 2013, Paul-Henri Campbell was called onto the editorial board of DAS GEDICHT, one of largest poetry magazines in the German language. Together with Michael Augustin and Anton G. Leitner he initiated the annual anthology DAS GEDICHT chapbook. German Poetry Now. Its goal is to present contemporary German poetry to an international audience in English translation.

Awards
 2018 Förderpreis des Herrmann-Hesse-Literaturpreises (Promotion Award of the Herrmann-Hesse Literary Prize)
2017 Bayerischer Kunstförderpreis (Bavarian Arts and Literary Prize)
 2012 Dichtungsring, Bonn (Germany): Award in Translation.
 2012 Poet-in-Residence, Dresden (Germany) (Finalist together with Carl-Christian Elze and Róža Domašcyna)

Publications

Author
 Duktus Operandi. Poetry, ATHENA-Verlag, Oberhausen 2010.
 Meinwahnstraße. Short Stories, fhl-Verlag, Leipzig 2011.
 Space Race. Gedichte: Poems, fhl-Verlag, Leipzig 2012.
 space race. Gedichte, (new edition), Allitera Verlag, Munich 2015.
 Benedikt XVI. Audio Book, (speakers: Andreas Herrler and Mirko Kasimir), Monarda Publishing House, Halle/Saale 2012.
 At the End of Days | Am Ende der Zeilen. Gedichte:Poetry, fhl-Verlag, Leipzig 2013.
 nach den narkosen | after anesthesia. Wunderhorn Verlag, Heidelberg 2017.
 Tattoo & Religion. Die bunten Kathedralen des Selbst.  Heidelberg 2019, .

Editor/Translator
 Paul-Henri Campbell (ed.): Sottorealism. Aris Kalaizis, Imhof-Verlag, Petersberg 2013.
 Ludwig Steinherr: All Ears, Lyrikedition 2000, Munich 2013 (translated by Paul-Henri Campbell).
 Michael Augustin, Anton G. Leitner, Paul-Henri Campbell (eds.): DAS GEDICHT chapbook. German Poetry Now, Weßling/Munich 2014.
 Alexandru Bulucz, Leonhard Keidel, Paul-Henri Campbell (eds.): "Es ist so dunkel, dass die Menschen leuchten." Zum Werk von Werner Söllner, "Die Wiederholung", Heidelberg 2017.
 Ludwig Steinherr: Light Song / Lichtgesang. Translated by Paul-Henri Campbell. Lyrikedition 2000, Munich 2017.
 Michael Braun, Paul-Henri Campbell (eds.): Lyrik-Taschenkalender 2018, Wunderhorn Verlag, Heidelberg 2017.

See also

 Sir Orfeo
 Sottorealism

References

External links
 Publisher's Website 
 Author's Website 
 Publisher's Press Release to Campbell's first volume of poems, dukuts operandi, 
 
 

1982 births
German poets
Living people
American people of German descent
American poets in German
American Roman Catholic poets
American writers in German
German essayists
German male short story writers
German short story writers
21st-century American poets
American male poets
American male essayists
German male poets
German-language poets
21st-century short story writers
21st-century American essayists
21st-century American male writers
German male essayists